3-Acetylcoumarin has the molecular formula C11H8O3 and is also identified as 3-acetylchromen-2-one. 3-Acetylcoumarin has a molecular weight of 188.18 g/mol and a melting point of 119-122 °C. 3-Acetylcoumarin is thought to induce apoptosis in breast cancer cells.

References 

Coumarins
Ketones